The Bayano Wars were armed conflicts in the Isthmus of Panama that occurred between the Bayano of Panama and the Spanish crown. The First War of the Bayano took place from 1548 to 1558, while the Second War took place from 1579 and 1582. Slavery, practiced since the early sixteenth century in Panama, brought many enslaved people from Africa to Spanish America. This brought successive slave uprisings against the rulers of the time, which was the origin for the Bayano Wars.

References

History of Panama
Conflicts in 1548
Conflicts in 1579
16th-century rebellions
Rebellions against the Spanish Empire
Slavery in the Spanish Empire
Slave rebellions in South America
1540s in South America
1550s in South America
1570s in South America
1580s in South America